The 2013 PDC Pro Tour was a series of non-televised darts tournaments organised by the Professional Darts Corporation (PDC). They were the Professional Dart Players Association Players Championships, the UK Open Qualifiers, and the European Tour events. This year there were 32 PDC Pro Tour events – 16 Players Championships, 8 UK Open Qualifiers, and 8 European Tour events.

Prize money
Prize money for each UK Open Qualifier was £34,600, unchanged from 2012. Prize money for each Players Championship has been increased from £34,600 to £50,000, and the prize money for European Tour events has been increased to £100,000.

PDC Pro Tour Card
128 players were granted Tour Cards, which enabled them to participate in all Players Championships, UK Open Qualifiers and European Tour events.

Tour cards 
The 2013 Tour Cards were awarded to:
63 of the top 64 players from the PDC Order of Merit after the 2013 World Championship ( Devon Petersen resigned his card)
37 Tour Card winners from 2012 not included among the 64 Order of Merit qualifiers (  Gary Butcher,  Liam Kelly,   Dave Smith and  Les Wallace resigned their cards)
The two highest non-exempt players from the PDC Unicorn Youth Tour ( Chris Aubrey and  Josh Payne)
The winner of the Scandinavian Darts Corporation's Order of Merit ( Jarkko Komula)
25 qualifiers from a four-day Qualifying School in Wigan (four semi-finalists from each day, plus the top nine players from the Q School Order of Merit)

Q School
The PDC Pro Tour Qualifying School took place at the Robin Park Tennis Centre in Wigan from January 17–20.

A Q School Order of Merit was also created by using the following points system:

To complete the field of 128 Tour Card Holders, places were allocated down the final Qualifying School Order of Merit. The following players picked up Tour Cards as a result:

Players Championships
(All matches – best of 11 legs)

There were 16 Players Championship events this year. The first of these was played in Wigan on 4 May 2013 and the last in Wigan on 24 November 2013. The top 32 after all events have been completed will qualify for the 2013 Players Championship Finals.

Players Championship 1 in Wigan on 4 May. 

Players Championship 2 in Wigan on 5 May. 

Players Championship 3 in Wigan on 25 May. 

Players Championship 4 in Wigan on 26 May.  

Players Championship 5 in Crawley on 22 June.  

Players Championship 6 in Crawley on 23 June.  

Players Championship 7 in Barnsley on 14 September.

Players Championship 8 in Barnsley on 15 September.

Players Championship 9 in Dublin on 5 October.

Players Championship 10 in Dublin on 6 October.

Players Championship 11 in Killarney on 19 October.

Players Championship 12 in Killarney on 20 October.

Players Championship 13 in Wigan on 2 November. 

Players Championship 14 in Wigan on 3 November. 

Players Championship 15 in Barnsley on 23 November. 

Players Championship 16 in Barnsley on 24 November.

UK Open Qualifiers
The results from the eight qualifiers shown below were collated to form the UK Open Order of Merit. The top 32 players received entry into the final stages of the 2013 UK Open, with the top 96 (plus ties) entering in the earlier rounds.

European Tour

Challenge Tour
The PDC Challenge Tour was open to anyone aged between 14 and 25, who wasn't in the top 64 of the PDC Order of Merit. The top two in the Order of Merit received Tour Cards for 2014.

Scandinavian Darts Corporation Pro Tour

The Scandinavian Pro Tour had eight events this year, with a total of €40,000 on offer. The leader of the Order of Merit after four events qualified for the 2013 European Championship. The winner after all eight events earned a place in the 2014 World Championship.

 Reference for the dates, tournament names and venues in the table

North American Pro Tour

The North American Pro Tour was for players from the USA and Canada. The top player in this ranking got into the 2014 World Championship.

 References for the dates, tournament names and venues in the table

Australian Grand Prix Pro Tour

The Australian Grand Prix rankings are calculated from events across Australia. The top player in the rankings automatically qualifies for the 2014 World Championship.

Other PDC tournaments
The PDC also held a number of other tournaments during 2013. These were mainly smaller events with low prize money, and some had eligibility restrictions. All of these tournaments were non-ranking.

References

External links
2013 PDC calendar
PDC event list

 
Pro Tour
PDC Pro Tour